Petr Čermák (born 24 December 1942) is a Czech rower who competed for Czechoslovakia in the 1964 Summer Olympics and in the 1968 Summer Olympics.

He was born in Prague.

In 1964 he was a crew member of the Czechoslovak boat which won the bronze medal in the eights event. He won gold in the London 2012 Olympics. 

Four years later he finished fifth with the Czechoslovak boat in the eight competition.

External links
 profile

1942 births
Living people
Czech male rowers
Czechoslovak male rowers
Olympic rowers of Czechoslovakia
Rowers at the 1964 Summer Olympics
Rowers at the 1968 Summer Olympics
Olympic bronze medalists for Czechoslovakia
Olympic medalists in rowing
Rowers from Prague
Medalists at the 1964 Summer Olympics